The 2016–17 TT Pro League season (known as the Digicel Pro League for sponsorship reasons) is the eighteenth season of the TT Pro League, the Trinidad and Tobago professional league for association football clubs, since its establishment in 1999. A total of ten teams are contesting the league, with Central FC the defending champions from the 2015–16 season.
The league started on the 29 September 2016 and ended on the 5 February 2017 with the crowning of the champion. On 5 February 2017, Central FC made history as they won their 3rd consecutive Pro League title, the only team to make such a feat.

Changes from the 2015–16 season 
North East Stars merged with Ma Pau S.C. to form Ma Pau Stars. Ma Pau S.C. had last appeared in the 2010–11 season.

Teams

Team summaries

Note: Flags indicate national team as has been defined under FIFA eligibility rules. Players may hold more than one non-FIFA nationality.

Stadiums

Since the teams do not play in their set home stadium, these are the stadiums that were used to host the matches throughout the season.

League table

Positions by round

Results

Matches 1–18

Season statistics

Top scorers

References

External links 
Soca Warriors Online, TT Pro League

TT Pro League seasons
2016–17 in Caribbean football leagues